The 1970 United States Senate special election in Illinois was held on November 3, 1970 to fill the remainder of the term of Republican Everett Dirksen, who had died in office. Republican Ralph Tyler Smith had been appointed to fill the seat after Dirksen's death, and he lost the special election to Democrat Adlai Stevenson III.

Election information
The primaries and general election coincided with those for House and state elections.

Primaries were held on March 17.

Turnout
Turnout in the primary elections was 26.28%, with a total of 1,381,147 votes cast.

Turnout during the general election was 67.43%, with 3,599,272 votes cast.

Democratic primary

Republican primary

General election

References

1970
Illinois
United States Senate
Illinois 1970
Illinois 1970
United States Senate 1970